Okhee Lee (born 1959) is an American education scholar and professor of childhood education.

Career 
Okhee Lee is a professor of childhood education at New York University’s Steinhardt School of Culture, Education, and Human Development. Lee is involved in establishing equity in the education of STEM (science, technology, engineering, mathematics) and computational thinking for all K-12 students, including students learning English as an additional language, referred to as English learners by the U.S. Department of Education. She is an author of five books and more than 100 refereed journal articles on educational research, policy and practice.

Lee is ranked since 2015 as one of the most influential educational academics in the U.S. by Ed-Scholar Public Influence Rankings published by Education Week.

Lee holds a Ph.D. from Michigan State University, where in 2022 she received an Honorary Doctor of Humanities degree and delivered the keynote speech at the Baccalaureate Commencement Ceremony. She began her career at the University of Miami in Coral Gables, Florida, and rose to professor in the school of education. Lee endowed student scholarships in memory of her late husband at Michigan State University, University of Miami, and the Korean-American Educational Research Association. 

In 2011, Lee went to New York University, where she is a professor and the principal investigator of the NYU SAIL Research Lab. With funding from the National Science Foundation, the SAIL team develops elementary school curriculum materials and teacher professional development resources that support science learning, language learning, and computational thinking for all students, including English learners.

Research 
Lee’s recent publications call for collaboration among educators, scholars, and policymakers to ensure that English language proficiency standards are used in a conceptually sound and practically feasible manner. The AERA invited Lee to discuss the significance of her 2019 study, “Aligning English Language Proficiency Standards with Content Standards: Shared Opportunity and Responsibility Across English Learner Education and Content Areas,” in a published video.

At present her research:

 addresses diversity, equity, and inclusion in STEM, including computational thinking, that is grounded in contemporary theoretical perspectives;
 integrates multiple education disciplines on behalf of all students, especially English learners; and
 connects to educational policy and practice at the national level.

Lee’s first two decades of research, starting in the early 1990s, established her as a leader in science education and equity. With funding from the National Science Foundation and the U.S. Department of Education, her research grew to large-scale intervention research to promote science learning for English learners across the four largest school districts in Florida.

Lee was named to the Next Generation Science Standards (NGSS) writing team and was leader of the NGSS Diversity and Equity Team from 2011 to 2013. At the same time, she was a member of the steering committee for the Understanding Language Initiative at Stanford University. With Helen Quinn and Guadalupe Valdés, Lee produced a study on science and language for English language learners in relation to NGSS. The AERA invited Lee to discuss the significance of her 2013 study, “Science and Language for English Language Learners in Relation to Next Generation Science Standards and with Implications for Common Core State Standards for English Language Arts and Mathematics,” co-authored with Quinn and Valdés, in a published video. The New York State Education Department collaborated with Lee, whose work contributed to the NYS P-12 Science Learning Standards adopted in December 2016. Lee and her research team created the “Science Initiative,” a series of webinars and briefs released in 2021 that serve as instructional resources for teachers to promote implementation of the standards and equitable opportunities for English language learners and other multilingual learners.

Selected publications 

 Nordine, J., & Lee, O. (Eds.). (2021). Crosscutting concepts: Strengthening science and engineering learning. National Science Teaching Association.
 Lee, O., & Campbell, D. T. (2020). What science and STEM teachers can learn from COVID-19: Harnessing data science and computer science through the convergence of multiple STEM subjects. Journal of Science Teacher Education, 31(8), 932-944. 
 Lee, O., & Stephens, A. (2020). English learners in STEM subjects: Contemporary views on STEM subjects and language with English learners. Educational Researcher, 49(6), 426-432.
 Lee, O. (2019). Aligning English language proficiency standards with content standards: Shared opportunity and responsibility across English learner education and content areas. Educational Researcher, 48(8), 534-542.
 Lee, O. (2018). English language proficiency standards aligned with content standards. Educational Researcher, 47(5), 317-327.
 Lee, O. (2017). Common Core State Standards for ELA/literacy and Next Generation Science Standards: Convergences and discrepancies using argument as an example. Educational Researcher, 46(2), 90-102.
 Lee, O., Quinn, H., & Valdés, G. (2013). Science and language for English language learners in relation to Next Generation Science Standards and with implications for Common Core State Standards for English language arts and mathematics. Educational Researcher, 42(4), 223-233. 
 Fradd, S. H., & Lee, O. (1999). Teachers’ roles in promoting science inquiry with students from diverse language backgrounds. Educational Researcher, 28(6), 14-20, 42.
 Lee, O., & Fradd, S. H. (1998). Science for all, including students from non-English language backgrounds. Educational Researcher, 27(4), 12-21.

Honors 
 Honorary Doctor of Humanities degree recipient and keynote speaker at Baccalaureate Commencement Ceremony, Michigan State University, 2022
 National Academy of Education member, 2022
 2021 class of Fellows, American Association for the Advancement of Science
 Exemplary Contributions to Practice-Engaged Research Award, American Educational Research Association, 2021
Distinguished Service to Science Education Award, National Science Teaching Association, 2020
 Inaugural Distinguished Researcher Award, Korean-American Educational Researchers Association, 2019
 Division K Innovations in Research on Equity and Social Justice in Teacher Education Award, American Educational Research Association, 2019
 2009 class of Fellows, American Educational Research Association
 Distinguished Career Contribution Award from the Committee for Scholars of Color in Education, American Educational Research Association, 2003

Footnotes

External links 
OkheeLee.com, personal website
Okhee Lee faculty page at New York University
NYU Sail Research Lab
Video: Aligning English Language Proficiency Standards With Content Standards
Video: Prof Lee and Prof. Emer. Quinn Discuss English Language Learners Study

American educational theorists
1959 births
Living people
New York University faculty
University of Miami faculty
Michigan State University alumni
South Korean emigrants to the United States
People from Daegu
Women educational theorists
Fellows of the American Association for the Advancement of Science